"Allting som vi sa" is a song recorded by Swedish singer Ida Redig. The song was released as a digital download in Sweden on 10 February 2018 and peaked at number 74 on the Swedish Singles Chart. It took part in Melodifestivalen 2018, but did not qualify out of the second semi-final on 10 February 2018. It was written by Redig along with Yvonne Dahlbom and Jesper Welander.

Track listing

Charts

Release history

References

2018 singles
2017 songs
Melodifestivalen songs of 2018
Swedish-language songs
Warner Music Group singles